Josif Pančić (April 17, 1814 – February 25, 1888) was a Serbian botanist, a doctor of medicine, a lecturer at the Great School (the future University of Belgrade), and the first president of the Serbian Royal Academy. He extensively documented the flora of Serbia, and is credited with having classified many species of plants which were unknown to the botanical community at that time. Pančić is credited with discovering the Serbian spruce. He is regarded as the father of Serbian botany.

Life

Early life and studies
Josip Pančić was born in Ugrini, near Crikvenica, on the Croatian Military Frontier, a territory in the Habsburg monarchy. At the time of his birth the region was part of the French Empire. Pančić was the fourth son of Pavel Pančić and his wife Margarita. His paternal grandfather, who came from the area around Niš, had served in a volunteer battalion of the Austrian Imperial Army during the Austro-Turkish War. According to tradition, the Pančić family hailed from Herzegovina and settled in Ugrini in olden times.

After finishing elementary school in Gospić, he went on to the lyceum in Rijeka, and then continued classes in the Regia Academica Scientiarum in Zagreb (1830). He graduated in 1842 in Budapest in medicine. In addition to other courses, Pančić attended botany courses, taught by the then renowned botany professor, Joseph Sadler (Sadler József). Later, recalling those early lectures, he wrote:

Work
While studying about botany at the Natural History Museum in Vienna, Pančić became acquainted with the Serbian linguist Vuk Stefanović Karadžić who wrote him a letter of recommendation to the Serbian authorities, in order to fulfill his wish to settle in the Principality of Serbia to study Nature. In May 1846 he arrived in Serbia where for the first seven years he worked as a physician in rural area. In 1847 he asked to be released from his Austrian citizenship and applied for Serbian citizenship, the same year he met his future wife Lyudmila Mileva.

In 1853, he moved from Kragujevac to Belgrade when he was first appointed adjunct professor at Belgrade Lyceum's Department of Natural History and Agronomy by decree of Prince Alexander Karadjordjević, before becoming a full-time professor of Natural History and Agriculture in 1854, as decreed by the Ministry of Education of the Principality of Serbia.

As Professor of Natural Sciences, he as one of the six original professors (along with Konstantin Branković, Jovan Sterija Popović, Đura Daničić, Matija Ban, and Dimitrije Nešić), of the Lyceum of the Principality of Serbia.

He later became rector of the Great School (the future University of Belgrade) and the founder of the Institutes of Mineralogy and Geology, Zoologial and Botanical Departments and of the experimental botanical gardens in Belgrade.

Pančić extensively documented the flora of Serbia and is credited with having classified many species of plants that were unknown to the botanical community at the time. He discovered a total of 47 valid species new to science. The crowning achievement of Pančić floristic studies was the "Flora of the Principality of Serbia" published in 1874, while a supplement was added ten years later. His explorations marked the golden age of Serbia's botany.

His most significant discovery was the Serbian Spruce, which he discovered near Zaovine on the Tara Mountain in 1875. He firmly established Serbian botany among European sciences. He ascertained that Serbia's flora was rich and worthy of further studies. During the Serbian–Ottoman War (1876–78), he was the Chief Physician of the Belgrade Hospital.

He is said to have "fallen in love" with Kopaonik, which he visited 16 times between 1851 and 1886. Pančić was named the first president of the Serbian Royal Academy formed on April 5, 1887. He requested the opening of the Botanical garden "Jevremovac" in Belgrade. Pančić died on 25 February 1888, his last wish was to be buried in the Kopaonik Mountain.

Legacy

A mausoleum of Josif Pančić was erected at the highest peak of Kopaonik in 1951 by the Academy of Science, the University of Belgrade and the Hiking club, with the inscription:

A research society has been named after him, Josif Pančić Biological Research Society (Biološko istraživačko društvo "Josif Pančić"). He was depicted on the 10 Dinars note printed in 1994. He is included in The 100 most prominent Serbs. In 1951 the highest point in the Kopaonik mountain range was changed from Milan Peak to Pančić's Peak.

On April 17, 2010, Google celebrated his birthday with a Google Doodle.

Awards
 Order of St. Sava
 Order of the Cross of Takovo
 Order of the Red Cross

Selected works
 Die Flora der Serpentinberge in Mittel-Serbien (1859)
 Pisces Serbiae (1860)
 Zur Moosflora des nordöstlichen Banates (1861)
 Arena mobilis in Serbia eiusque flora (1863)
 Flora agri Belgradensis methodo analytica digesta – "Flora u okolini Beogradskoj po analitičnom metodu" (1865)
 Šumsko drveće i šiblje u Srbiji (1871)
 Flora Principatus Serbiae – "Flora knez̆evine Srbije ili vaskularne biljke, koje y Srbije divlie rastu" (1874)
 Eine neue conifere in den östlichen Alpen (1876)
 Flora u okolini Beogradskoj po analitičnoj sistemi (1878)
 Elementa ad floram principatus, Bulgariae (1883)
 Nova graca za flora knez︠h︡evine Bugarske (1886)
 Collected works in 11 volumes

Gallery

Notes
 His name is mostly written as Serbian Josif Pančić (Јосиф Панчић).

See also
 Lujo Adamović
 Nedeljko Košanin
 Sava Petrović

References

Sources

External links

 
 
 Feljton: Josif Pančić, Večernje Novosti, 27 February 20082 March 2008 

1814 births
1888 deaths
Serbs of Croatia
19th-century Serbian people
Serbian botanists
Members of the Serbian Academy of Sciences and Arts
Academic staff of Belgrade Higher School
Botanists with author abbreviations
People from Primorje-Gorski Kotar County
People from the Principality of Serbia
People from the Kingdom of Serbia
Immigrants to the Principality of Serbia
Serbian paleontologists
Serbian Roman Catholics
Habsburg Serbs
Austro-Hungarian Serbs
Academic staff of the Lyceum of the Principality of Serbia